Infinity TV is a TV Service Provider based at Edmonton in Alberta Canada. It was launched in December 2020.

Programming 
 Ihlamurlar Altında

References

External links 
 Infinity TV (Official website)

See also 
 Dubai Media City

Television stations in the United Arab Emirates
Mass media in Dubai